Jon D. Myers is an American politician. As of 2013, he is a lobbyist for the Community Bankers Association of Ohio, and was a member of the Ohio House of Representatives from 1991 to 2000.  His district consisted of a portion of Licking County, Ohio.  He was succeeded by Tim Schaffer.

References

Year of birth missing (living people)
Living people
Republican Party members of the Ohio House of Representatives